Francisco Pérez de Grandallana (1774–1841) was a brigadier of the Spanish Royal Navy. He fought in the English blockades of Cádiz, the Battle of Trafalgar and the Spanish War of Independence.

People from Jerez de la Frontera
1775 births
1841 deaths

Spanish naval officers